Corydoras eques, the horseman's cory catfish or true eques cory, is a tropical freshwater fish belonging to the subfamily Corydoradinae of the family Callichthyidae. It was first described by Austrian zoologist Franz Steindachner. It is native to the Brazilian Amazon basin. The name eques means knight in Latin.

Life cycle 
The male fertilizes the female's 2–4 eggs between her pelvic fins for around 30 seconds. Only then does the female swim to a suitable location and attach the very adhesive eggs. The couple continues doing this until around 100 eggs have been fertilized and connected.

References 

eques
Fish of the Amazon basin
Endemic fauna of Brazil
Fish described in 1877